Group A of the 1995 King Fahd Cup took place between 6 and 10 January 1995. Denmark won the group, and advanced to the final, while Mexico finished second and advanced to third-place playoff. Saudi Arabia failed to advance.

Standings

Results

Saudi Arabia v Mexico

Saudi Arabia v Denmark

Denmark v Mexico

References

A
1994–95 in Danish football
1994–95 in Mexican football
1994–95 in Saudi Arabian football